The 2022–23 Minnesota State Mavericks men's ice hockey season is the 54th season of play for the program. They represent Minnesota State University, Mankato in the 2022–23 NCAA Division I men's ice hockey season and for the 2nd season in the Central Collegiate Hockey Association (CCHA). The Mavericks will be coached by Mike Hastings, in his 11th season, and play their home games at Mayo Clinic Health System Event Center.

Season

Departures

Recruiting

Roster
As of August 6, 2022.

|}

Standings

Schedule and results

|-
!colspan=12 style=";" | Exhibition

|-
!colspan=12 style=";" | Regular Season

|-
!colspan=12 style=";" | 

|-
!colspan=12 style=";" |

Scoring statistics

Goaltending statistics

Rankings

Note: USCHO did not release a poll in weeks 1 or 13.

References

2022-23
Minnesota State Mavericks
Minnesota State Mavericks
Minnesota State Mavericks
Minnesota State Mavericks